Ēriks is a Latvian masculine given name, which is the cognate of the given name Eric, meaning "eternal ruler". The name may refer to:

Ēriks Ešenvalds (born 1977), Latvian composer
Ēriks Grigjans (born 1964), Latvian footballer
Ēriks Koņeckis (1920–2006), Latvian ice hockey player
Ēriks Mesters (1926–2009), Latvian theologian and archbishop
Ēriks Pelcis (born 1978), Latvian footballer
Ēriks Pētersons (1909–1987), Latvian footballer and ice-hockey player
Ēriks Rags (born 1975), Latvian javelin thrower
Ēriks Raisters (1913–1942), Latvian footballer  
Ēriks Ševčenko (born 1991), Latvian ice hockey player
Ēriks Vanags (1892–2001), Latvian track and field athlete

References

Latvian masculine given names